The Rochester Area Colleges Center for Excellence in Math and Science (RAC-CEMS, or RACCEMS) is an association of 19 post-secondary educational institutions located on the Nazareth College campus in Rochester, NY in west-central New York State. The RAC-CEMS focuses on the development and delivery of STEM (Science, Technology, Engineering, and Mathematics) topics in K-16 education and supporting programs designed to increase the quality and quantity of the student talent pool pursuing curricula in math, science and related technical fields.

About the RAC-CEMS 

The Rochester Area Colleges is a consortium of higher education institutions in the Rochester, New York metropolitan area. Founded in 1970, Rochester Area Colleges has numerous area public and private colleges as members, and provides collaborative working opportunities for colleges and their students. The purpose of the association is to support the functions of career development, placement, and experiential education in the region.  In 2006, Senator Schumer called for Rochester to become a math-science teaching center of excellence and gathered together presidents of Rochester colleges to establish a national math and science teaching center.  He also pushed for the Senate Appropriations Committee approve a grant under the FY07 Labor, Health and Human Services and Education Appropriations Bill for the RAC-CEMS to be funded.  In December or 2007, the RAC-CEMS was awarded nearly $1,000,000 in federal money to pay for an expansion of teacher-training programs.

Mission 

The goal of the RAC-CEMS is that the Rochester, New York region will continue to be nationally recognized for innovative and effective education of young scientists, engineers, mathematicians and their teachers.

RAC-CEMS Website 

The Center for Excellence(COE) in Math and Science maintains a website that pulls together resources from the community. This site is a collaborative effort to link students, parents, educators, counselors, and community members to local STEM events and community resources, including specific subject area support.

Rochester Area College Consortium 

The RACCEMS consortium consists of:

 Alfred State College
 Alfred University
 Colgate Rochester Crozer Divinity School
 Corning Community College
 Empire State College
 Finger Lakes Community College
 Hobart and William Smith Colleges
 Keuka College
 Monroe Community College
 Nazareth College
 Roberts Wesleyan College
 Rochester Institute of Technology
 Saint John Fisher College
 St. Bernard's School of Theology and Ministry
 State University of New York College at Brockport
 State University of New York College at Geneseo
 University of Rochester
 Wells College

References

Education in New York (state)